Madison Junior High School may refer to:

 Madison Junior High School in North Platte, Nebraska.
 Madison Junior High School in Naperville, Illinois, part of Naperville Community Unit School District 203.
 Madison Junior High School in Mansfield, Ohio.
 Madison Area Junior High School in Madison, Maine.
 Madison Junior High School in Rexburg, Idaho